The VI Bomber Command was a military formation of the United States Army Air Forces.  Its last assignment was with Sixth Air Force. It was based throughout its service at Albrook Field, in the Panama Canal Zone.  It was inactivated on 1 November 1946.

It engaged in antisubmarine operations from the Canal Zone. It was credited with two submarines sunk and shared two others.

Lineage
 Constituted as the 6th Bomber Command  on 17 October 1941
 Activated on 25 October 1941
 Res\designated VI Bomber Command  c. 18 September 1942
 Inactivated on 1 November 1946
 Disbanded on 8 October 1948

Assignments
 Caribbean Air Force (later 6th Air Force, Sixth Air Force), 25 October 1941 – 1 November 1946

Components
 Groups
 6th Bombardment Group, 25 October 1941 – 1 November 1943
 9th Bombardment Group, 25 October 1941 – 31 October 1942 (attached to VI Fighter Command after 28 January 1942)
 25th Bombardment Group, 25 October 1941 – 6 April 1944
 40th Bombardment Group, 25 October 1941 – 6 April 1942 (attached to 6th Interceptor Command after 15 January 1942); 22 June 1942 – 9 July 1943

 Squadrons
 3d Bombardment Squadron, 1 November 1943 – 1 November 1946
 10th Bombardment Squadron, attached 13 December 1943, assigned 17 December 1943 - c. 9 May 44
 29th Bombardment Squadron, 1 November 1943 – 1 November 1946
 59th Bombardment Squadron, 25 October 1941 – 19 March 1943 (attached to Trinidad Detachment, VI Fighter Command after 21 July 1942)
 74th Bombardment Squadron, 1 November 1943 – 1 November 1946
 397th Bombardment Squadron, 1 November 1943 – 1 November 1946

References

Notes
 Explanatory notes

 Citations

Bibliography

 
 

06
Military units and formations disestablished in 1946